District 43 of the Oregon House of Representatives is one of 60 House legislative districts in the state of Oregon. As of 2013, the boundary for the district includes a portion of Multnomah County. The current representative for the district is Democrat Tawna Sanchez of Portland.

Election results
District boundaries have changed over time, therefore, representatives before 2013 may not represent the same constituency as today. General election results from 2000 to present are as follows:

See also
 Oregon Legislative Assembly
 Oregon House of Representatives

References

External links
 Oregon House of Representatives Official site
 Oregon Secretary of State: Redistricting Reform Task Force

Oregon House of Representatives districts
Multnomah County, Oregon